DMX: Soul of a Man is a reality television series that recorded the daily life of rapper DMX, and aired primarily on Black Entertainment Television (BET).

The six-episode series showcases various aspects of his personal and religious life. The theme song Lord Give Me A Sign is a single from his album "Year of the Dog...Again". The show features DMX, Tashera Simmons, Buddy Wood, Ali Samii, Jack Hudgins, and Randy Acker. Producer Swizz Beatz makes a cameo appearance.

Theme songs

Opening themes

Additional scoring done by Russell "Aaddict" Howard.
Music composing done by Zack "bizness" Burke, Pint, Lab Ratz, Brainz And Nate.

Episodes

Each episode of the show offers a behind the scenes look into the life of DMX, as he travels from New York to Arizona, in hopes of finding peace, before his stint in jail for a traffic violation. As the rapper reflects on his past and questions the future, viewers get a glimpse of his personal experiences as a father, husband, and friend.

References

External links 
 

BET original programming
2000s American reality television series
2006 American television series debuts
2006 American television series endings
Hip hop television
African-American reality television series
Television series based on singers and musicians
DMX (rapper)